Pigwalk is the second full-length studio album by rap metal group Stuck Mojo. This album is considered to be a milestone in the rap metal genre. Stuck Mojo performed "(Here Comes) The Monster" and "Mental Meltdown" on MTV's 1996 Headbangers Ball. A music video for "Pigwalk" was also made. Despite this, the album found little mainstream success, much like the previous album, Snappin Necks. In 2006, the album was reissued, adding almost the entire Violated EP (minus the live version of "F.O.D."), the demo "Hate Must Be A Gift", and two covers of Iron Maiden's "Wrathchild" and Mötley Crüe's "Shout at the Devil" (all three of which were previously released on the Violate This compilation).

Track listing
All songs written by Bonz and Rich Ward, except where noted.
 "Pigwalk" 3:44
 "Mental Meltdown" 4:46
 "(Here Comes) The Monster" (Bonz, Ward, Bud Fontsere, Corey Lowery) 3:39
 "Twisted" (Bonz, Ward, Dwayne Fowler) 3:39
 "The Sermon" (Fontsere) 1:43
 "Despise" (Bonz, Lowery) 3:12
 "Animal" 3:48
 "Only the Strong Survive" 4:54
 "Violated" 3:24
 "Inside My Head" (Devin Townsend, Ward) 4:12
 "Down Breeding" 3:58
 "F.O.D." 4:12 (live, bonus track)
 "(Here Comes) The Monster" 3:51 (live, bonus track)

References

1996 albums
Stuck Mojo albums
Century Media Records albums
Albums produced by Devin Townsend